is a former Japanese football player.

Playing career
Nakazato was born in Kamakura on April 24, 1982. He joined J2 League club Shonan Bellmare based in his local from youth team in 2000. He debuted in 2000 and became a regular player as side midfielder in 2001. However he injured his shoulder and could hardly play in the match in 2002. Although he played many matches as defensive midfielder from 2003, he injured his left knee in June 2004. Although he came back in 2005, he could not play many matches. In 2006, he moved to J1 League club Sanfrecce Hiroshima on loan. He played many matches as substitute from summer. In 2007, he returned to Shonan Bellmare. He retired end of 2007 season.

Club statistics

References

External links

1982 births
Living people
People from Kamakura
Association football people from Kanagawa Prefecture
Japanese footballers
J1 League players
J2 League players
Shonan Bellmare players
Sanfrecce Hiroshima players
Association football midfielders